The Delinquent Season is a 2018 Irish romantic drama film written and directed by Mark O'Rowe in his feature film directorial debut. It follows the story of two married couples in suburban Dublin who begin to experience difficulties in their respective relationships. The film was released theatrically in Ireland on 27 April 2018 by Element Pictures.

Plot

Yvonne is waiting in a restaurant alone for someone. An undisclosed man arrives and greets Yvonne.

Jim and his wife Danielle are hosting a dinner party, where Danielle's best friend Yvonne and her husband Chris are guests. A disagreement erupts between Yvonne and Chris, Chris taking issue with the way Yvonne discussed her seeing of him spending time with their daughters, at which Chris was angered by the implications of this and thus the assumption Danielle and Jim would make of him as a father.

One day, Jim, locked out of his house after collecting his two children from school and his wife Danielle at work, has nowhere to go. After speaking to Danielle on the phone, she suggests that he visit Yvonne to collect the spare key. Jim reckons it will be awkward due to the argument at the dinner party, but he goes anyway. Jim and Yvonne chat over coffee whilst the children play together in the garden. Jim learns that Chris's recent outbursts stem from mood swings he is experiencing due to an undisclosed brain-related illness. Chris has not yet told his children or Yvonne and swears Jim to secrecy.

Jim and his children are having lunch one day in a restaurant. As the waitress Orla approaches to collect the plates, Jim queries as to whether one of the meals was supposed to include fries as they had not accompanied the meal. A dispute between Jim and Orla ensues and Orla swears at Jim. They leave the restaurant.

One night, after another argument at home with Chris which results in a physical attack, Yvonne and her children take shelter at Jim and Danielle's house overnight. The next morning, with Jim remote working and Yvonne at work and the children all at school, Jim and Yvonne talk about marriage. Yvonne confesses her feelings for Jim and they have sex in his bed. They soon begin a fully fledged affair, having sex regularly in a hotel room and subsequently on a nearby beach where they are caught.

Yvonne, having learnt both of Chris's illness and the fact it is terminal, is angry with Jim and also rejects the prospect of pursuing a relationship with him, despite her early encouragement in the affair that he leave Danielle and she leave Chris.

One afternoon, Jim falls asleep and is late picking his children up from school. He lies to the headteacher as to why this was, however, he is caught out later when Danielle asks why he was late and he fails to use the same excuse he did in front of his children, with his children saying he is lying. This arouses Danielle's suspicion and she asks for the passcode to Jim's phone. He questions her intentions and refuses to give it to her. He later confesses to having an affair, but refuses to say who with and is forced to leave their house. Danielle later tells Yvonne about Jim's affair, unaware that Yvonne is the one Jim has been cheating on her with.

One night, Jim turns up on Yvonne's doorstep. He wants to know if Yvonne will return to him upon Chris's death and he confesses his love for her. Yvonne is annoyed at this and that Jim knew Chris was ill when he slept with her.

Jim goes to a bar to drink alone. He runs into Orla. They discuss their earlier disagreement over the meal and the philosophy of the customer always being right. Orla asks Jim to stay for a drink with her, which he does. Jim wakes up next to Orla in her bed the following morning. He receives a phone call from Danielle informing him of Chris's death. As Jim is dressing to leave, Orla asks to see Jim again, but he questions whether it was just a one-night stand. In response, Orla verbally abuses Jim and orders him to leave.

At Chris's funeral, Danielle is there with her new partner, Jim's children talk positively about him, upsetting Jim as he fears he has lost his children. Jim then attacks Danielle's new partner who gets the upper hand and Jim ends up in hospital. In the waiting room alone, he breaks down emotionally.

Sometime later, Yvonne is waiting in a restaurant alone, as she was at the beginning of the film. It is revealed that the person she was waiting for was Jim. They both catch up and get along. Yvonne suggests she and Jim rekindle their relationship, but Jim is now in a relationship. Yvonne returns home. Distraught, she cries at her front door. Jim returns home to Orla, with whom he is living. They argue over where Jim has been, but he is honest with her. Orla comforts him and they chat about the restaurant whilst cuddling on the sofa. Jim assures Orla he felt nothing for Yvonne upon seeing her again.

Cast
 Cillian Murphy as Jim
 Eva Birthistle as Danielle
 Catherine Walker as Yvonne 
 Andrew Scott as Chris
 Lydia McGuinness as Orla

Production
The Delinquent Season was filmed in Dublin.

Reception
Harry Guerin gave the film four stars, remarking, "If this film reminds us of anything, it's not to let go lightly."

Tara Brady of The Irish Times was much more negative, giving it two stars out of five, saying, "The denizens of The Delinquent Season are all ghastly and yet – despite valiant efforts from a talented ensemble cast – not quite horrid enough to be interesting or engaging. [...] O'Rowe's stylised language – an often potent dialect that sets observational banter to Mametian rhythms – sounds off-key on a big screen."

References

External links
 
 
 
 

2018 films
2018 independent films
2018 romantic drama films
2010s English-language films
Adultery in films
Films about cancer
Films about couples
Films about death
Films set in Dublin (city)
Films shot in Dublin (city)
Irish independent films
Irish romantic drama films
English-language Irish films